The Muslim Scout Association of Lebanon was established in 1912, the first Scout movement in Lebanon and the Arab world.

Mohammad Abdul Jabbar Khairy was the founder of the Scout movement in Lebanon, one of the three Indians who sought education in the universities of Beirut. When he traveled to Great Britain the Scout movement aroused the interest of Mohammad Khairy during his stay in London for studies. On his return to Beirut, and by the encouragement of the administration of Dar El O'loum School and its board of trustees headed by Sheikh Toufik El Hibri (1869-1954), the establishment of The Ottoman Scout was announced in 1912.

In 1914 World War I broke out, Khairy left Beirut, so Mohammad Omar Mneimneh took charge of the movement, with the participation of Moheiddine Nsouli, Baha'elddine Tabbah and Said Sinno in administering the school's Scout movement.

In 1915 Mohammad Omar Mneimneh traveled to Istanbul to serve in the army so the movement stopped.

After the war the movement was revived by Mohammad Said, Abdullah Dabbouss, Moheiddine and AbdulRahman Koronfol and Omar Onssi and supported by Saadullah Itani, and was called The Syrian Scout.

The first constitution was passed on 30 September 1920; the name Ottoman and Syrian were substituted with Muslim Scout Association. 29 June 1921 registration No. 3-22 The Muslim Scout Association started its activity under this name.

On 12 December 1934 the license was renovated under the No. 2-797, and since then and the association has proved itself as a protector of morality and principles as well as ideals in order to provide a youth which is pure in thought, work and word.

The emblem of the Muslim Scout Association of Lebanon features a hand with an out-turned palm, related to the five pillars of Islam.

See also
Lebanese Scouting Federation

External links
 Official website

Scouting and Guiding in Lebanon
World Organization of the Scout Movement member organizations
Youth organizations established in 1912
1912 establishments in the Ottoman Empire